The Alliance for Change (AxC) was a political alliance formed in Mexico for the purpose of contesting the general election of 2 July 2000 against the-then ruling Institutional Revolutionary Party.

History 
There were two member parties of the alliance: the National Action Party (Partido Acción Nacional, or PAN), and the Green Ecological Party of Mexico (Partido Verde Ecologista de México, or PVEM).

With 43.43% of the popular vote in a three-horse race, the Alliance for Change's candidate for the position of President of Mexico, Vicente Fox, was declared the winner of the election, putting an end to 70 years of hegemonic rule by the Institutional Revolutionary Party (PRI). Between them, the two parties also won 221 seats in the Chamber of Deputies (of 500) and 51 in the Senate (of 128).

Dissolution 
One year after Fox took office, however, the PVEM publicly broke with the PAN as regards its support for him. Since then, the PVEM has more frequently allied itself with the PRI to fight gubernatorial and local elections.

Electoral history

Presidential elections

Congressional elections

Chamber of Deputies

Senate elections

Ecologist Green Party of Mexico
National Action Party (Mexico)
2000 elections in Mexico
Political organizations based in Mexico
2000 in Mexican politics
Vicente Fox
Defunct political party alliances in Mexico